Hastings is a community in the Canadian province of Nova Scotia, located in  Annapolis County.

Hastings was the scene of a thriving lumber operation, E. D. Davison & Sons, between 1905 and 1921, after which it was abandoned. Its peak of production was during World War I when the mill averaged 170,000 board feet of lumber in a 10-hour shift. Producing 7.8 million board feet of lumber annually, it was at the time the busiest saw milling operation in Nova Scotia. The mill and a small town was built on the east side of Mill Lake, now known as Springfield lake. The town dispersed after the mill burnt down in 1928.

See also
 Springfield, Nova Scotia

References

Communities in Annapolis County, Nova Scotia
Ghost towns in Nova Scotia
Populated places established in 1905
Populated places disestablished in 1921
1905 establishments in Nova Scotia
1921 disestablishments in Nova Scotia